The Vancouver British Columbia Temple is a temple of the Church of Jesus Christ of Latter-day Saints. It is the seventh in Canada and the first in British Columbia.

History
Announced on May 25, 2006, the temple is located on a  site at 200 Street and 82 Avenue in the suburb of Langley. To signify the beginning of construction, Ronald A. Rasband presided at a groundbreaking ceremony on August 4, 2007. A public open house was held 9–24 April 2010 prior to the dedication of the temple on 2 May 2010, by church president Thomas S. Monson. Following dedication, only church members with a temple recommend are permitted to enter the temple.

In 2020, like all the church's other temples, the Vancouver British Columbia Temple was closed due to the COVID-19 pandemic.

See also

 Comparison of temples of The Church of Jesus Christ of Latter-day Saints
 List of temples of The Church of Jesus Christ of Latter-day Saints
 List of temples of The Church of Jesus Christ of Latter-day Saints by geographic region
 Temple architecture (Latter-day Saints)
 The Church of Jesus Christ of Latter-day Saints in Canada

Additional reading

References

External links
Vancouver British Columbia Temple Official site
Vancouver British Columbia Temple at ChurchofJesusChristTemples.org

21st-century Latter Day Saint temples
Langley, British Columbia (district municipality)
Religious buildings and structures in British Columbia
Religious buildings and structures completed in 2010
Temples (LDS Church) in Canada
2010 establishments in British Columbia
21st-century religious buildings and structures in Canada